Major Walter Troup (16 October 1869 – 14 December 1940) was an English first-class cricketer who was born in Uttar Pradesh, India. He was a member of the inaugural All-India team.

He debuted for Gloucestershire in 1887 at the age of 17. A defensive batsman, it is said that he once batted for 95 minutes against Lancashire during a game in 1888 and didn't score a run. Troup often opened the batting with his captain WG Grace and made his highest score of 180 against Nottinghamshire at Bristol in 1898. When Grace left the county Troup became captain for a season before going back to India. He became District Superintendent of Police in the North-West Provinces of the country and in the war he was a captain in the Royal Flying Corps.

References

External links

1869 births
1940 deaths
English cricketers
Indian cricketers
Gloucestershire cricketers
Gloucestershire cricket captains
Gentlemen cricketers